List of weapons used by the Irish National Liberation Army during The Troubles (1969–1997).

Sources

Obtaining arms was one of the greatest difficulties faced by the INLA in its early years. Their Marxism made them beyond help from Catholic Irish-America, who had traditionally been a lifeline for funds and weapons for Irish republicans engaged in armed struggle. At a time when the Provisional IRA seemed replete with Armalites, the INLA was mainly armed with shotguns, which the rank and file wryly took to calling "Costello-ites" after their leader. The INLA's main source of arms early on was from sympathizers in the Middle East, from where they imported a contingent of AK-pattern rifles in 1978 and later much larger shipments of arms via a French contact.

Small arms

Explosives

References